Simon Carmiggelt (7 October 1913 – 30 November 1987) was a Dutch writer, journalist, and poet who became a well known public figure in the Netherlands because of his daily newspaper columns and his television appearances.

Biography
Simon Johannes Carmiggelt was born on 7 October 1913 in The Hague, the second son of Herman Carmiggelt and Adriana Bik. He had one older brother, Jan (Johannes Simon). Simon did poorly in school and he left secondary school in 1929. He enjoyed working as an editor for the school paper though, and he was determined to become a journalist.

After various editorial jobs, he became a reporter for the socialist newspaper Het Volk ("The People"). Later on he worked for the same paper as a drama critic. He wrote short columns about daily life in The Hague, which he called Kleinigheden ("Trifles"). In 1939 Simon married Tiny de Goey. A year later she gave birth to a daughter, Marianne. In the same year the first collection of Kleinigheden was published, named Vijftig dwaasheden ("Fifty follies").

When Nazi Germany invaded the Netherlands in 1940 and Het Volk was taken over and censored, Carmiggelt resigned from the paper. During the Second World War he had all sorts of small jobs, but he secretly got in touch with the Dutch resistance and worked for the underground newspaper Het Parool ("The Password"). He was responsible for the lay-out and printing of the paper. He wrote a few stories for Het Parool.

Under the German occupation of the Netherlands, Simon's brother Jan was arrested by the Nazis in 1943 for aiding persons in hiding. He was taken to Herzogenbusch concentration camp, where he died of exhaustion on 26 September 1943. Jan's death was to change the rest of Simon's life; he would never fully overcome the trauma it caused.

After the war he again started to write columns for Het Parool; he signed them with the pen name Kronkel ("Twist", or "Kink"). His Kronkels became known for their melancholic, sometimes sombre tone and the ironic use of formal language. Many columns were about unsuccessful, disillusioned people in cafes and bars (often in Amsterdam, where he then lived), who told the writer about their lives. Carmiggelt wrote about his children and later his grandchildren, his cats and other small events in his life. His work became popular and he received various Dutch literary prizes. Together with the Dutch-Indo author and essayist Tjalie Robinson he is credited with establishing a whole new genre in Dutch literature that found successors like Rudy Kousbroek.

In 1977 Carmiggelt started an affair with author Renate Rubinstein. She wrote a book about this, titled Mijn beter ik (My better self), which was published when both she and Simon had died. Carmiggelt's last Kronkel was published in 1983. On 30 November 1987 he died of a heart attack. A year after his death, a statue of Carmiggelt (made by Kees Verkade) was placed near his former house in Amsterdam and one of him and his wife on a park bench near his summer house in De Steeg (Rheden). This last statue was stolen in the weekend of 21 January 2012. It was retrieved on 25 January, sawn into many pieces. Three men have been arrested in relation to this event; the motive is still unclear. The statue was pieced together by the sculptor Wik Kuijl and then re-unveiled in its original site on 23 January 2013.

Selected bibliography
 1940 - Vijftig dwaasheden
 1940 - Honderd dwaasheden (extended version of Vijftig dwaasheden)
 1941 - Johan Justus Jacob
 1948 - Allemaal onzin
 1948 - Het jammerhout
 1950 - Klein beginnen
 1951 - Omnibus
 1952 - Poespas
 1954 - Al mijn gal
 1954 - Articles de Paris
 1955 - Duivenmelken
 1956 - Fabriekswater
 1956 - Kwartet
 1956 - Spijbelen
 1957 - Haasje over
 1959 - Een toontje lager
 1961 - Alle orgels slapen
 1961 - Een stoet van dwergen
 1962 - Dag opa
 1962 - Kroeglopen I
 1962 - Tussen twee stoelen
 1963 - Oude mensen
 1963 - We leven nog
 1964 - Later is te laat
 1964 - Kinderen (combination of Klein beginnen en Dag opa)
 1965 - Kroeglopen II
 1965 - Fluiten in het donker
 1965 - Mooi weer vandaag
 1967 - Morgen zien we wel weer
 1968 - Drie van vroeger
 1968 - Je blijft lachen
 1969 - Mijn moeder had gelijk
 1970 - Twijfelen is toegestaan
 1971 - Gewoon maar doorgaan
 1972 - Ik mag niet mopperen
 1973 - Elke ochtend opstaan
 1974 - Brood voor de vogeltjes
 1975 - Slenteren
 1975 - Maatschappelijk verkeer
 1976 - Dwaasheden (1976)
 1977 - Vroeger kon je lachen 1978 - Bemoei je d'r niet mee 1979 - De rest van je leven 1979 - Mooi kado 1980 - De avond valt 1980 - Residentie van mijn jeugd 1981 - Een Hollander in Parijs 1981 - Verhaaltjes van vroeger 1982 - Welverdiende onrust 1983 - De Amsterdamse kroeg 1983 - Met de neus in de boeken 1983 - Mag 't een ietsje meer zijn 1984 - Ik red me wel 1984 - Vreugden en verschrikkingen van de dronkenschap 1984 - Alle kroegverhalen (combination of Kroeglopen I en ~II)
 1985 - Ontmoetingen met Willem Elsschot 1986 - Bij nader omzien 1986 - Trio voor één hand 1987 - De vrolijke jaren 1987 - Het literaire leven 1989 - Zelfportret in stukjes 1990 - De kuise drinker 1992 - Schemeren 1993 - Van u heb ik ook een heleboel gelezen... 1995 - Thelonious en Picasso 1999 - Beste Godfried, beste Simon 1999 - VoorhoutTranslations

English
 1957 - A Dutchman's slight adventures 1958 - Amsterdam by Simon Carmiggelt, Maria Austria, and Flora van Os-Gammon
 1972 - I'm just kidding: More of a Dutchman's slight adventuresEsperanto
 2002 - Morgau denove ni viduGerman
 1990 - Heiteres Aus Amsterdam. Erzaehlungen; Simon Carmiggelt und Marga Baumer

References
Print
 Gelder, Henk van. Carmiggelt: het levensverhaal. (Nijgh & Van Ditmar 1999) 
 Rubinstein, Renate. Mijn beter ik: herinneringen aan Simon Carmiggelt''. (Meulenhoff, 1991)

External links
 Simon Carmiggelt - Bi(bli)ography

1913 births
1987 deaths
20th-century Dutch male writers
20th-century Dutch journalists
20th-century Dutch poets
Constantijn Huygens Prize winners
Dutch columnists
Dutch humorists
Journalists from The Hague
Dutch male poets
Dutch resistance members
Dutch satirists
P. C. Hooft Award winners
Writers from Amsterdam
Writers from The Hague